Crocy is a commune in the Calvados department and Normandy region of north-western France. It is situated close to Falaise.

The name is believed to derive from the Gallo-Roman personal name Crossius.

Population

See also
Communes of the Calvados department

References

Communes of Calvados (department)
Calvados communes articles needing translation from French Wikipedia